Robert Crompton (26 September 1879 – 16 March 1941) was an English professional footballer. He spent the entirety of his career with his hometown club, Blackburn Rovers. He also represented England on 41 occasions, captaining them 22 times.

Playing career
Born in Blackburn, Crompton spent his entire career at full-back for Blackburn Rovers, playing 528 games between 1896 and 1920. He won the league twice as captain of the team in 1912 and 1914. In the 1915–16 season he played for Blackpool in the regional leagues set up by the Football League during World War I where he was made club captain. His 41 England caps were a record until surpassed by Billy Wright in 1952. He began his career as a centre-half, but it was at full-back that he excelled, Charlie Buchan describing him as "...the outstanding full-back of his time. A commanding personality, he was the best kicker of a ball I ever ran across."

Managerial career
Crompton later went on to manage Blackburn between 1926 and 1930, leading them to the FA Cup victory over Huddersfield Town in 1928. After a spell managing Bournemouth & Boscombe Athletic, Crompton returned to Rovers as manager in the late 1930s to guide them to the Second Division championship.

Crompton had a heart attack in 1941 while watching Blackburn play Burnley, while he was still in charge of Blackburn. His team had just won the match 3–2. He died that evening.

After retirement and legacy
Crompton was in partnership with his Blackburn Rovers teammate, the Welsh international centre-forward William Davies, as motor engineers.

It was announced on 25 February 2015 via Twitter that Bob Crompton would be inducted to the Hall of Fame by the National Football Museum as a 'Historic Player'.

Bob Crompton became the first player (and manager) to be entered into the Blackburn Rovers Football Club Hall of Fame on 8 February 2019

Honours

As a player
Blackburn Rovers
First Division: 1911–12, 1913–14

As a manager
Blackburn Rovers
FA Cup: 1928
Second Division: 1938–39
Football League War Cup runner-up: 1939-1940

References

External links

England Player Profile: Robert Crompton at englandfc.com
Profile at englandfootballonline

1879 births
1941 deaths
Footballers from Blackburn
English footballers
Association football defenders
England international footballers
Blackburn Rovers F.C. players
Blackpool F.C. wartime guest players
English football managers
Blackburn Rovers F.C. managers
AFC Bournemouth managers
English Football League players
English Football League representative players
English Football Hall of Fame inductees